The Last Supper Cave, near Denio, Nevada, United States, is an archeological site that is listed on the National Register of Historic Places.  It was listed on the National Register in 1975, for its potential to yield information in the future.

Archeologists found that it had "evidence of substantial Paleoindian occupations including 44 Paleoindian points".

References

History of Humboldt County, Nevada
Archaeological sites on the National Register of Historic Places in Nevada
Geography of Humboldt County, Nevada
National Register of Historic Places in Humboldt County, Nevada